Nipawin Bible College is an evangelical interdenominational training school on a  site just south of Nipawin, Saskatchewan. The college is affiliated with the Canadian Council of Christian Charities, the Saskatchewan Association of Theological Colleges (SATC), and the Evangelical Fellowship of Canada (EFC).  Jason Elford is currently the Interim President at the college.

History
Nipawin Bible College, incorporated as Two Rivers Bible Institute (TRBI), was founded in 1934 at the height of the Great Depression. Its first campus was located at the fork where the Leather River joins with the Carrot River.

Campus
Nipawin Bible College owns 110 acres (45 ha) of land just south of Nipawin, Saskatchewan.  Of this land approximately 30 acres is developed for Campus use.

The campus uses 4 main buildings:

 Art Linsey Education Centre (classrooms, library, chapel, administration, book store)
 Rempel Auditorium (housing the Leppington Student Centre and gymnasium)
 Snider Hall (ladies residence)
 Baxter Hall (men's residence)
 Dining Hall (with fitness centre in basement)

5 single home dwellings sit on campus, along with a 4 unit complex.  Additionally, a 3 unit building called "Evan's Wing" sits close to the Baxter Hall.  There are currently 2 mobile homes on campus as well.

Programs
NBC offers programs from 1 to 4 years. Available programs are Foundations For Life, Christian Ministry Diploma, Bachelor of Christian Ministry, Bachelor of Arts in Biblical Studies, Bachelor of Arts in Pastoral Ministry, and Certificate of Selected Studies.

Athletics
The colleges athletic team, Nipawin Royals are a former member of the Prairie Athletic Conference in indoor and outdoor soccer. Currently the school competes in the Nipawin Indoor Soccer League and on campus intramural leagues.

PAC Provincial Championships
Men's Indoor Soccer/Futsal (1) (2011)
Men's Outdoor Soccer (1) (2010)

Solar power
In December 2014, Nipawin Bible College went online with what was then tied for the largest array of solar panels in the province of Saskatchewan.   At over 7000 square feet and producing 150,000 kilowatt-hours (kWh) of electricity, the college is able to save approximately $17,000 annually at 2015 electricity rates.

References

External links

Association for Biblical Higher Education
Educational institutions established in 1935
Colleges in Saskatchewan
Bible colleges
Evangelical seminaries and theological colleges in Canada
1935 establishments in Saskatchewan